Kenya National Congress (KNC) is a Kenyan political party founded in 1991 during the early days of the return of Multiparty Democracy as a result of a split in FORD-Asili. It has consistently fielded candidates in general elections since 1992 at Parliamentary and Local Authority levels. The party sponsored Gatanga Member of Parliament Peter Kenneth, who launched his presidential bid on the party ticket, as well as an alliance between him and Raphael Tuju of the Party of Action
The stated vision of KNC, as according to its official web site, is to see Kenya as a proud and prosperous nation that takes care of all her citizens and where hope and self-confidence thrives among all Kenyans both at home and abroad.

The Party Mission
The stated Mission of KNC is to provide a people driven Government that is participatory, and consultative, building a free market economy driven by the people; ensuring a more equitable distribution of income and wealth within a secure environment for all.

Party Philosophy 
Kenya National Congress' philosophy is to foster unity and unlock Kenya's potential for a better and a brighter Kenya, guided by good governance under a stable and people-driven Government that is development- oriented, transparent, peaceful and corruption-free.
In keeping with this philosophy, KNC stands FOR:
 Upholding democratic principles and institutionalisation of democracy in Kenya. KNC stands for a democratic society wedded to equity and social justice and committed to the preservation of the unity and integrity of our country. KNC looks at democracy as a holistic outcome of ensuring equal rights to each and everyone in the country, politically, economically and socially. KNC shall ensure equal opportunity for all in all spheres of life, especially education and skill development with special affirmative action for the deprived sections of the society.
 Ensuring the unity and integrity of Kenya by strengthening a decentralised Government for Kenya and upholding the rule of law without any prejudice to any region, race, tribe, sex or status.
 Building an economically progressive nation based on the free-market economy where private enterprise is encouraged and direct Government participation in business is minimised.
 Fostering a vibrant and dynamic society based on pluralism and diversity; to replace elitism with free competition; to provide an equal opportunity for all Kenyans especially in the area of education; and to encourage policies that create equal opportunities for all including women, youth and the disabled
 Encouraging and empowering Kenyans to participate in the Nation's political process; to respect human, civil and political rights of all Kenyans; to achieve a free flow of information in society

Core values 
KNC's stated beliefs are that:
 Reconciliatory, honest and participatory politics is essential for the self-sustaining democracy
 The primary reason for the existence of the Government and leaders is to serve the citizens
 Safeguarding human rights is the responsibility of the Government
 Provision of security for people and their property is the prime responsibility of the Government
 Provision of basic needs for all is a human right
 Justice must be administered efficiently, effectively and without favour
 Freedom of ideas, speech and association are essential components of democracy for sustainable good governance

Notable members
 Manson Oyongo Nyamweya
 John Imoite
 Onesmus Kioko

References

1991 establishments in Kenya
Political parties established in 1991
Political parties in Kenya